Orinoeme xanthosticta is a species of beetle in the family Cerambycidae. It was described by Gestro in 1876.

References

X
Beetles described in 1876